Michael Alexander Blake (born December 25, 1982) is an American politician and member of the Democratic Party. He formerly served as a New York Assemblyman from the 79th district and was the Vice Chair of the Democratic National Committee from 2017 to 2021.

Early life and education
Blake was born on December 25, 1982, in the Bronx to parents who had immigrated from Jamaica. He was named after Michael Manley and Alexander Bustamante. After graduating from New York City public schools, Blake went on to attend and graduate from Northwestern University with a degree in journalism. While at Northwestern, he served as student council president and was close friends with Jason Wright, who later became the first black president of an National Football League team upon his hiring by the Washington Commanders in 2020.

Career
Blake began his career working in the Michigan House of Representatives and for Illinois State Senator Jeffrey Schoenberg.

Blake served as the Iowa deputy political director for Barack Obama in the 2008 United States presidential election, and following his election to the presidency, Blake became associate director of public engagement and the deputy associate director of the Office of Intergovernmental Affairs. He served as the national deputy director of Operation Vote for President, Obama’s 2012 re-election. Blake was noted in Jet magazine as one of nine black politicos behind President Obama’s re-election.

In 2013, he served as the campaign manager for Reshma Saujani for New York City Public Advocate. He helped to found the Atlas Strategy Group, which focuses on policy issues for communities of color.

New York State Assembly
In 2014, Assemblyman Eric Stevenson was found guilty on corruption charges and was required to vacate his seat. Blake entered the race to replace him. His own candidacy was not without controversy, and the Bronx Democratic Party, who did not support his candidacy, claimed he was not actually a resident of the Bronx. Despite these setbacks, Blake won the Democratic primary over five other candidates. He easily won the general election with nearly 92% of the vote.

Blake was sworn-in for his first term on December 15, 2014. He currently is the Chair of the Subcommittee on Mitchell-Lama and is a member of the Corrections, Housing, Banks, Veterans, Election Law and Governmental Operations committees.

Blake did not seek re-election in 2020; instead, he ran for U.S. House of Representatives.

2019 New York City Public Advocate campaign 
In 2018, Blake announced his candidacy for New York City Public Advocate. He lost to City Councilmember Jumaane Williams in a crowded race with 17 other candidates.

2020 U.S. House of Representatives campaign

In 2019, Blake announced his campaign for New York's 15th congressional district; the then-current Representative, José E. Serrano, had announced his retirement from Congress. He lost, finishing in second place behind winner Ritchie Torres in the Democratic primary.

Personal life
Blake is close friends with Jason Wright, a classmate of his at Northwestern who later became the first black president of a National Football League (NFL) franchise upon his hiring by the Washington Commanders in 2020.

References

External links

Assemblyman Michael Blake government website
Michael Blake for Congress campaign website

1982 births
21st-century American politicians
American politicians of Jamaican descent
Living people
Northwestern University alumni
Democratic Party members of the New York State Assembly
Politicians from the Bronx